Carlos Eduardo Romero Millaqueo (born 2 January 1997) is a Chilean freestyle wrestler who currently competes at 70 kilograms. Romero is a two–time medalist of the Pan American Continental Championships (2017 and 2021).

Career 
A late starter, Romero started competing internationally when he was 18 years old in 2015. He has competed multiple times at a variety of events, such as the World Championships (junior level), the Pan American Championships (five times, including thrice as a junior), the South American Championships (twice) and a couple of Grand Prixes.

Major results

References

External links 
 

Living people
1997 births
Chilean male sport wrestlers
Pan American Wrestling Championships medalists